The Ammendale Normal Institute is a U.S. historic location in Beltsville, Maryland. Bought in 1880, it was a school and novitiate operated by the Institute of the Brothers of the Christian Schools. The Ammendale area is named after the previous owner, Daniel Ammen.

Construction of the main building began in 1883 and was completed in 1884 with Thomas C. Kennedy as the leading architect.

Religious use
Also known as "Christian Brothers" and "Ammen Institute," the building had seen several uses over its lifetime. Though it last served as a sort of "retirement home" for aging or retired Brothers; in recent history, it was also used as an active monastery. Peter Boyle is a notable alumnus of what has been described as the monastery's 'boot-camp'.

The main building suffered a devastating fire in April, 1998. Its ruins stood until late 2006 when what was left of the building was demolished. Ammendale was one of many historical buildings in the region with valuable real estate that was developed after a fire set to the structure, including Troy Hill (1990), Avondale Mill (1991), St. Mary's College (1997), Henryton State Hospital (2007), (2011)
In 2014, NAI Michael placed 8 acres containing the foundation of the Normal Institute and the remaining historic brick barn up for sale. The nearby St. Joseph's Catholic Chapel is a recognized historic site. There is also a parish cemetery and one for the Brothers.

St. Joseph’s Catholic Chapel
St. Joseph's Catholic Chapel, built in 1880, on 20 acres of land for a novitiate plus five acres for the church donated by Admiral Daniel Ammen, from whom the Ammendale name is derived. It is a front-gabled brick chapel with ornate Queen Anne detail. Jigsawn vergeboards adorn the eaves of the principal gable front, the gothic-arch windows are filled with stained glass, and the interior walls and ceilings are sheathed with pressed tin in a pattern of fleurs-de-lis, palmettes, and a rich, multicourse cornice. A large cemetery adjoins the chapel.

References

External links 

Buildings and structures in Prince George's County, Maryland
Beltsville, Maryland
Schools in Prince George's County, Maryland
Religious buildings and structures completed in 1880
National Register of Historic Places in Prince George's County, Maryland
Properties of religious function on the National Register of Historic Places in Maryland
School buildings on the National Register of Historic Places in Maryland
Historic American Buildings Survey in Maryland
Victorian architecture in Maryland
1880 establishments in Maryland